Diamine oxidase (DAO), also known "amine oxidase, copper-containing, 1" (AOC1), formerly called histaminase, is an enzyme involved in the metabolism, oxidation, and inactivation of histamine and other polyamines such as putrescine or spermidine in animals. It belongs to the amine oxidase (copper-containing) (AOC) family of amine oxidase enzymes. In humans, DAO it is encoded by AOC1 gene.

The highest levels of DAO expression are observed in the digestive tract and the placenta. In humans, a certain subtype of cells of the placenta, namely the extravillous trophoblasts, express the enzyme and secrete it into the blood stream of a pregnant woman. Lowered diamine oxidase values in maternal blood in early pregnancy might be an indication for trophoblast-related pregnancy disorders like early-onset preeclampsia. Normally the enzyme is not or only very scarcely present in the blood circulation of humans, but it increases vastly in pregnant women suggesting a protective mechanism against adverse histamine. It is also secreted by eosinophils. In case of a shortage of diamine oxidase in the human body, it may appear as an allergy or histamine intolerance.

Supplementation 
For people with a histamine intolerance, the benefits of supplementation are inconclusive due to limited research.

References

External links 
 

EC 1.4.3
Histamine
Copper enzymes